Deoxyguanosine is composed of the purine nucleobase guanine linked by its N9 nitrogen to the C1 carbon of deoxyribose. It is similar to guanosine, but with one hydroxyl group removed from the 2' position of the ribose sugar (making it deoxyribose). If a phosphate group is attached at the 5' position, it becomes deoxyguanosine monophosphate.

Deoxyguanosine is one of the four deoxyribonucleosides that make up DNA.

See also
 8-Oxo-2'-deoxyguanosine

References

Nucleosides
Purines
Hydroxymethyl compounds